Vidaillat is a commune in the Creuse department in the Nouvelle-Aquitaine region in central France.

Geography

Population

Sights
 The church, dating from the fourteenth century.
 Remains of a motte and bailey castle at Creux-du-Renard.
 Two memorials to members of the French Resistance.

See also
Communes of the Creuse department

References

Communes of Creuse